Simson Pilkka (12 June 1880, Uusikirkko Vpl - 6 November 1959) was a Finnish farmer and politician. He was a member of the Parliament of Finland from 1919 to 1924 and again from 1929 to 1930, representing the Agrarian League.

References

1880 births
1959 deaths
People from Vyborg District
People from Viipuri Province (Grand Duchy of Finland)
Centre Party (Finland) politicians
Members of the Parliament of Finland (1919–22)
Members of the Parliament of Finland (1922–24)
Members of the Parliament of Finland (1929–30)